The Philippine Skating Union (PhSU) is the sports governing body of the Philippines for figure skating and short track speedskating. PhSU was granted provisional membership on June 13, 2004 by the International Skating Union. Full membership was granted upon the completion of an Olympic sized skating rink at the SM Mall of Asia. It is a National Sports Association duly recognized by the Philippine Sports Commission and the Philippine Olympic Committee. PhSU was originally established as the Ice Skating Institute of the Philippines.

Tournaments
Philippine Figure Skating Championships
Philippine Open Short Track Championships

References

External links
 
 Profile of the PSU at the ISU Official site

Skating Union
Philippines
International Skating Union
Speed skating in the Philippines